Alta Communications is an American private equity firm primarily working with media and the communication sector.

Their equity funds are invested in about 100 companies with a total market capitalization approximately $1.5 billion.

Alta Communications is no longer related to Alta Partners, based in San Francisco.

History
Alta Communications was formed in late 1996 as part of the dissolution of Burr, Egan, Deleage & Co. (BEDCO), an early venture capital firm that had been founded in 1979.

The firm was founded by Craig Burr and William P. Egan who also co-founded Alta’s predecessor firm, Burr, Egan, Deleage & Co., in 1979.  Alta traces its origins to TA Associates, where Burr and Egan were formerly partners.

Investment strategy and funds
Alta Communications invests primarily in later-stage opportunities in the traditional media and telecommunications sectors and has a portfolio of investments in the following sectors:

 Broadcasting (Radio and Television)
 Direct marketing services
 B2B Media / Publishing
 Content / Screen media
 Digital media
 Telecom services
 Out-of-home advertising
 Cable television

Since its founding in 1996, Alta Communications has raised four venture capital funds focusing on late stage opportunities with nearly $1.5 billion of investor commitments.

 1996 - $158m - Alta Communications VI 
 1998 - $272m - Alta Communications VII  
 2000 - $486m - Alta Communications VIII
 2003 - $500m - Alta Communications IX

See also
Burr, Egan, Deleage & Co.
Alta Partners
Polaris Venture Partners

References

Alta Communications and Mackler & Fisher Acquire HMP Communications (August 20, 2007)
A Generation Gap in Venture Capital
Gupta, Udayan.  Done Deals: Venture Capitalists Tell Their Stories, 2000

External links
Alta Communications corporate website

TA Associates
Venture capital firms of the United States
American companies established in 1996
Financial services companies established in 1996
Mass media companies established in 1996
Telecommunications companies established in 1996
Companies based in Boston